Lieutenant Admiral Sir William Woodhouse (by 1517 – 22 November 1564) was an English naval commander and administrator who rose to the rank of Lieutenant of the Admiralty and was head of the Council of the Marine later called the Navy Board. He also served as a Member of Parliament of the Parliament of England from 1545 to 1564. He was prominent during an important time of the Navy Royal's development in the later half of the Tudor period.

Naval career
William Woodhouse was a naval commander and administrator who served under Henry VIII of England. He went to sea early in life and his career advanced through service to the King. He was granted offices in Lynn Norfolk, and was appointed Escheator for Norfolk and Suffolk from 1538 to 1539. This was followed by his being appointed bailiff of the manor of Gaywood in 1540. In September 1542 he was appointed Captain of HMS Primrose until January 1543.

In February 1543 he was appointed admiral of four ships in the North Sea. In November 1543 he took charge of 10 ships stationed at Portsmouth with the intention of attacking French fishing waters. Appointed Vice-Admiral of the Fleet of the Earl of Hertford's expedition to Scotland in early 1544, he was knighted in Leith, Scotland in May 1544. He was next appointed Vice-Admiral in the Channel and Vice-Admiral at Boulogne from July to November 1544 serving under Admiral Sir Thomas Seymour. In April 1546 he was appointed a member of the Council of the Marine and made Master of Naval Ordnance from 1546 to 1552. His next appointment came in 1552 when he was given the office of the Keeper of Queenborough Castle which he held until 1553.

In December 1546 he was appointed head of the Council of the Marine as Lieutenant of the Admiralty until 1564. In 1554 he was appointed as both Vice-Admiral of Suffolk and Vice-Admiral of Norfolk until 1564. In 1557 he was a commander with John Clere of a fleet sent against Scotland. Clere died fighting at Kirkwall.

In October 1558 he was appointed for a second time Vice-Admiral in the Channel until January 1559. He remained as head of the Council of the Marine until 22 November 1564 when he died in office. The post of Lieutenant of the Admiralty then fell into abeyance until 1604.

Political career
William Woodhouse was also served as a Member of the Parliament of England elected for Great Yarmouth from 1545 to 1553, for Norfolk in 1558, Norwich from 1559 to 1563,  and Norfolk again from 1563 to his death in 1564. He is described as "of Hickling, Norfolk".

Family
Woodhouse was the younger son of John Woodhouse of Waxham and his elder brother was Vice-Admiral Sir Thomas Woodhouse.

Footnotes

Bibliography
 Bindoff, Stanley Thomas (1982). The House of Commons, 1509-1558: History of Parliament Trust. Woodbridge, England: Boydell & Brewer. .
 "Woodhouse, Sir William (by 1517-64), of Hickling, Norf". The History of Parliament. History of Parliament Trust.

1564 deaths
16th-century Royal Navy personnel
Year of birth uncertain
English admirals
English MPs 1545–1547
English MPs 1547–1552
English MPs 1553 (Edward VI)
English MPs 1558
English MPs 1559
English MPs 1563–1567
People from Hickling, Norfolk
1517 births
Members of the Parliament of England for Norfolk
Members of the Parliament of England for Norwich
Members of the Parliament of England for Great Yarmouth
Military personnel from Norfolk